Lucille Davy was the Commissioner of Education in New Jersey.  She was named acting commissioner on September 9, 2005, by former Governor of New Jersey Richard Codey.  She was named commissioner by Governor Jon Corzine as of July 11, 2006.

When she was named acting commissioner by Codey, she joined her husband, then Human Services Commissioner James Davy, in the cabinet.  They are the first husband and wife to serve together in a state cabinet.

She is a former education policy advisor to Codey and former Gov. James McGreevey.  When Corzine took office he announced his intention to retain Davy as acting commissioner while he led a national search for a new commissioner, a search which included Davy.  When he appointed Davy to the post, he said her work as acting commissioner convinced him to select her for the permanent post.

Davy is a lifelong New Jersey resident and grew up in Livingston, New Jersey where she was a graduate of Livingston High School. She graduated cum laude from Seton Hall University with a bachelor's degree in mathematics, and she received her law degree from the Notre Dame Law School. She and her husband reside in Pennington, New Jersey.

References

External links
Office of the Commissioner

Living people
Livingston High School (New Jersey) alumni
People from Livingston, New Jersey
People from Pennington, New Jersey
Seton Hall University alumni
State cabinet secretaries of New Jersey
Notre Dame Law School alumni
Year of birth missing (living people)